Soft tennis at the 2019 Southeast Asian Games was held at the Rizal Memorial Tennis Center, Manila, Philippines. It was held from 7 to 10 December 2019.

Medal summaries

Medal table

Medalists

References

External links
 

2019 Southeast Asian Games events